ATL Lantbrukets Affärstidning is a Swedish nationwide trade magazine for farmers. The magazine features articles on agricultural market and business issues. It is owned by the LRF Media and was founded 1884. Publisher is Annika R Hermanrud and editor i chief is Lilian Almroth. The editorial office is located in Stockholm.

In 2010 the circulation of ATL Lantbrukets Affärstidning was 51,700 copies.

References

External links
 Official site

1884 establishments in Sweden
Agricultural magazines
Magazines established in 1884
Magazines published in Stockholm
Business magazines published in Sweden
Swedish-language magazines